The Asia Submarine Cable Express (ASE) is a 7200 kilometer long underwater cable system launched for service in 2012 which connects Japan, Hong Kong, the Philippines, Malaysia, and Singapore.

References

Submarine communications cables in the Pacific Ocean
2012 establishments in Asia
Submarine communications cables in the Indian Ocean